Elmagünü is a village in the Genç District, Bingöl Province, Turkey. The village is populated by Kurds of the Tavz tribe and had a population of 149 in 2021.

The hamlets of Aşağıyaka, Kılıçlı and Yukarıyaka are attached to the village.

References 

Villages in Genç District
Kurdish settlements in Bingöl Province